Reşat Halis (1883 – 1945) was an Ottoman liberal politician, diplomat, and minister in the cabinet of Damat Ferid Pasha. Being one of the signatories of the Treaty of Sèvres, he was exiled for his collaboration with Allied forces during the Allied occupation of Constantinople.

References 

1883 births
1945 deaths
Political people from the Ottoman Empire